Chhota Udaipur is one of the 182 Legislative Assembly constituencies of Gujarat state in India. It is part of Chhota Udaipur district and is reserved for candidates belonging to the Scheduled Tribes.

List of segments
This assembly seat represents the following segments,

 Chhota Udaipur Taluka
 Jetpur Pavi Taluka (Part) Villages – Kanda, Borkanda, Chuli, Muvada, Jogpura (Gadh), Gadh, Bhikhapura, Oliya Kalam, Mota Amadra (Kadval), Nana Amadra (Kadval), Kadval, Rajpur (Kadval), Khatas, Jamba, Virpur, Samadi, Kadvapura, Kheda, Selva, Gundi, Zari, Kalikui, Bhabhar, Nani Khandi, Pani, Vadoth, Bar, Moti Khandi, Satun, Ghata, Kundal, Chethapur, Ambakhut, Int, Vasangadh, Udhaniya, Kevada, Jogpura (Dungar), Intvada, Mudhiyari, Kathola, Zab (Valothi), Narvaniya, Bhanpur, Hathipagla, Raypur, Dhanpur, Chaina, Lunaja, Muthai, Sagadra, Dungarvant, Ghuntia, Ghutanvad, Gambhirpura, Nani Bej, Bhanpuri, Magiya, Kadvakuva, Limbani, Bamroli, Shivajipura, Valothi, Vajpur, Mota Kantva, Nana Kantva, Fatepura, Vanki, Moti Bej, Sajod, Umarva, Khandiya Amadara, Uchapan, Ghagharpura, Segvasimli, Fata, Koliyari, Vaghava, Paliya, Tarapur, Rampura, Vav, Pavi, Jetpur, Moti Rasli, Nani Rasli, Thalki, Dabherai, Gogadiya, Motipura (Gadoth), Nani Bumdi.

Members of Legislative Assembly

Election results

2022

2017

2012

See also
 List of constituencies of the Gujarat Legislative Assembly
 Chhota Udaipur district
 Gujarat Legislative Assembly

References

External links
 

Assembly constituencies of Gujarat
Chhota Udaipur district